was the 7th daimyō of Aizu Domain in Mutsu Province, Japan (modern-day Fukushima Prefecture). His courtesy title was Higo-no-kami and Jijū, and subsequently raised to Sakonoe-gon-shōshō and his Court rank was Junior Fourth Rank, Lower Grade.

Biography
Matsudaira Katahiro was the younger son of Matsudaira Kataoki and became daimyō in 1806 at the age of four on his father's death.  In 1813, he was received in formal audience by Shogun Tokugawa Ienari and given the courtesy title of Higo-no-kami. This was changed to Sakonoe-gon-shōshō in 1816. He was wed to Moto-hime, the 15th daughter of Tokugawa Ienari, but died in 1822 without any heir. This ended the line of direct descent from Tokugawa Hidetada begun by Hoshina Masayuki, the first daimyō of Aizu.

See also
Hoshina clan

References 
 "Aizu-han" on Edo 300 HTML ) 
Noguchi Shin'ichi (2005). Aizu-han. Tokyo: Gendai shokan.

Shinpan daimyo
1803 births
1822 deaths
Aizu-Matsudaira clan
People of Edo-period Japan